Autumn Never Dies is a 2020 short comedy film directed by Chris Quick. It stars Duncan Airlie James and Nicollete McKeown and is the sequel to 2012 short film The Greyness of Autumn. The film was written and produced by Andy S. McEwan and Chris Quick and released by Suited Caribou Media and Pentagram Productions UK.

Plot
Puppets Danny & Nelson return in another whirlwind adventure in Autumn Never Dies the sequel to the 2012 short film, The Greyness of Autumn. When a new love interest enters into Danny's life, his past quickly comes back to haunt him and now must choose a path in life that will truly make him happy.

Main cast
Duncan Airlie James as Danny McGuire (Voice)
Nicolette McKeown as Lizzie
Lynn Murray as Dr Crawford
Chris Quick as Nelson (Voice)
Neil Francis as Barry
Amy E Watson as Katie
Ray Crofter as Father Muldoon
Alan Cuthbert as Mr Caribou (Voice)
John Gaffney as Black Eye Tam
Jim Sweeney as Terrorist Leader
Chris Martin as Callaghan / Agent Johnson
Michael Cooke as Horse / Agent Myers
Diane Brooks Webster as Natalie
Darren Connell as Alky Crow

Production
On 17 August 2015, a Kickstarter campaign was launched to raise funds for the production. The campaign successfully raised £1,505 from 44 backers including former Gamesmaster host Dominik Diamond.

Release and reception
The film was released on 21 March 2020 to mark World Puppetry Day. Autumn Never Dies received highly positive reviews from critics. In the United Kingdom, Jolly Moel of ScreenCritix said:

In the United States, Indyred wrote:

Awards

References

External links
 

Scottish films
Films set in Scotland
Films shot in Scotland
2020 films
2020s buddy comedy films
English-language Scottish films
Puppet films
British comedy films
British independent films
2020 comedy films
2020 short films
2020s English-language films
2020s British films